Caladenia harringtoniae, commonly known as the pink spider orchid, is a species of orchid endemic to the south-west of Western Australia. It has a single, hairy leaf and up to three pale to deep pink flowers which have a cream-coloured labellum with a pink tip.

Description
The flowers are pale pink to deep pink with spreading lateral sepals and petals. Flowering occurs from mid-September to early November.

Taxonomy and naming
Caladenia harringtoniae was first described in 2001 by Stephen Hopper and Andrew Phillip Brown from a specimen collected near Pemberton and the description was published in Nuytsia. The specific epithet (harringtoniae) honours Alison Harrington, a president of the Western Australia Native Orchid Study Group.

Distribution and habitat
The pink spider orchid occurs between Nannup and Albany in the Jarrah Forest and Warren biogeographic regions, where it grows swamps and flat areas that are flooded in winter.

Conservation
Caladenia harringtoniae is classified as "Threatened Flora (Declared Rare Flora — Extant)" by the Western Australian Government Department of Parks and Wildlife and as "vulnerable" by the Australian Government Environment Protection and Biodiversity Conservation Act 1999. The main threats to the species are fire during its growth and flowering period, grazing by feral pigs (Sus scrofa) and road maintenance activities.

References

harringtoniae
Orchids of Western Australia
Endemic orchids of Australia
Plants described in 2001
Endemic flora of Southwest Australia
Taxa named by Stephen Hopper
Taxa named by Andrew Phillip Brown